Marah Teboho Louw , also known as Marah Louw Thomson or Mara Louw, is a South African singer, songwriter and actress. She was born on 17 July 1952 in the suburb of Mzimhlophe in Soweto, South Africa.

She started singing in a choral group at the age of ten during which she toured Japan, Hong Kong, Philippines, South Africa and the United Kingdom. 

Upon her return to South Africa she toured Zambia, Botswana, Zimbabwe, Lesotho, Swaziland and Namibia as a solo artist.

Louw sang at the 1988 Nelson Mandela 70th Birthday Tribute concert at Wembley Stadium, London in support of the anti-apartheid struggle. 

She was an actress on the South African television series The Queen where she played the character Boi Maake until departing from the show in 2017. 

She was also a judge on the second season of Idols South Africa.

In 2018, she joined the African Content Movement, which was founded by Hlaudi Motsoeneng. The party contested the 2019 general election, with Motsoeneng and herself in first and second places respectively on the party's national list, failing to win a seat.

In August 2021 Louw presented to the South African parliament's Committee on Trade and Industry in support of copyright reform and royalty rights for artists.

References

1952 births
Living people
20th-century South African women singers
21st-century South African women singers